Panurgini is a tribe of bees in the family Andrenidae. There are about 9 genera and more than 830 described species in Panurgini.

Genera
These nine genera belong to the tribe Panurgini:
 Avpanurgus Warncke, 1972
 Camptopoeum Spinola, 1843
 Clavipanurgus Warncke, 1972
 Flavipanurgus Warncke, 1972
 Macrotera Smith, 1853
 Panurginus Nylander, 1848
 Panurgus Panzer, 1806
 Perdita Smith, 1853
 † Simpanurgus Warncke, 1972

References

Further reading

External links

 

Andrenidae
Articles created by Qbugbot